S/2019 S 1 is a natural satellite of Saturn. Its discovery was announced by Edward Ashton, Brett J. Gladman, Jean-Marc Petit, and Mike Alexandersen on 16 November 2021 from Canada-France-Hawaii Telescope observations taken between 1 July 2019 and 14 June 2021.

It belongs to the Inuit group of prograde irregular satellites, and is among the innermost irregular satellites of Saturn. It might be a collisional fragment of Kiviuq and Ijiraq, which share very similar orbital elements.

References

Inuit group
Irregular satellites
Moons of Saturn
20211116
Moons with a prograde orbit